The Caracol River  is a river in the state of Rio Grande do Sul, Brazil. It is a tributary of the Caí River.

The Caracol River is known for the dramatic Caracol Falls, a major tourist attraction.
The  Caracol State Park, established in 1973, protects the environment around the falls.

See also
List of rivers of Rio Grande do Sul

References

Rivers of Rio Grande do Sul